Like the term POJO (Plain Old Java Object) in the Java world, the term Plain Old C++ object or its acronym POCO means a C++ artifact that is neither defined by nor coupled to the underlying C++ component framework that manipulates it.

Examples of such an artifact include, for instance, instances of C++ classes, K&R structs, unions, or even functions (as function pointers). This is contrast to component model in classic C++ component frameworks, such as OMG-CCM, JTRS-SCA core framework (CF), OpenSOA's SCA for C++. These classic component frameworks either dedicate a proprietary component programming model (a super class), or mandate component implementations to be tightly coupled to the underlying framework (calling its runtime).

See also 
 Plain old data structure (POD)
 Plain Old Java Object (POJO)
 Plain Old CLR Object (another POCO term)

External links
 PocoCapsule/C++ An open source C++ component framework supporting plain old C++ objects.

C++